Adam Hamilton (20 August 1880 – 29 April 1952) was a New Zealand politician. He was the first non-interim Leader of the National Party during its early years in Opposition.

Early life
Hamilton was born in Forest Hill, near Winton, Southland. He originally trained to become a Presbyterian minister, but later decided not to pursue this course. He married Mary Ann McDonald in 1913, and in 1914, he and his brother John Ronald Hamilton started a grain business in Winton. In World War I, he was rejected for service on medical grounds.

Member of Parliament

In the 1919 election, Hamilton was elected to Parliament in the Southland seat of Wallace, standing as a Reform Party candidate. His brother John Ronald Hamilton was also elected, winning the neighbouring seat of Awarua from Joseph Ward. The brothers then sold their business, although Adam Hamilton remained active in the Southland agricultural sector. In the 1922 election, the brothers were both defeated, but they regained their seats in the 1925 election. Adam Hamilton retained his seat until his retirement, although his brother was defeated again in 1928.

When the Reform Party formed a coalition with the United Party, Hamilton was made Minister of Internal Affairs. He also served, at various times, as Minister of Telegraphs, Postmaster General, Minister of Labour, and Minister of Employment. He was not popular in these roles – Great Depression had resulted in high levels of unemployment, and Hamilton was often criticised for the government's failure to improve the situation. He was also criticised when the Post and Telegraph Department jammed a pro-Labour broadcast on a private radio station by Colin Scrimgeour just before the 1935 general election. Hamilton denied knowledge of the jamming, but his reputation was nevertheless damaged.

In 1935, Hamilton was awarded the King George V Silver Jubilee Medal. Having served as a member of the Executive Council for more than three years, Hamilton was granted the retention of the title of "Honourable" following the 1935 election.

Party leader
In 1936, after losing power to the Labour Party, Reform and United agreed to merge, creating the National Party. Despite his somewhat tarnished public image, Hamilton was selected to lead the new party, taking over from interim leader George Forbes. Hamilton was essentially a compromise candidate – Forbes and his main opponent, Gordon Coates, refused to serve under each other, and the Coates faction backed Hamilton as an acceptable alternative. George Forbes himself is believed to have preferred Charles Wilkinson, but Coates (formerly the leader of Reform) was determined to have a fellow Reformist as leader. Hamilton was duly elected, although only by one vote.

Given the narrowness of his victory, many did not see Hamilton as the National Party's real leader. He was frequently accused by being a puppet of Coates, with suggestions even being made that Hamilton was merely holding the position until Coates built up the strength to take it himself. Hamilton was not particularly charismatic, and did not inspire great loyalty from his colleagues. He was also closely associated in the public mind with the Depression era.

In the 1938 election, Hamilton and the National Party were harshly critical of the Labour government, accusing it of promoting communism and of undermining the British Empire. The campaign was seen by many as alarmist and negative, and Hamilton's own performance was widely censured. On election day, National was heavily defeated.

The National Party's defeat weakened Hamilton's grasp on the leadership somewhat, but any debate as to his future was cut short by the onset of World War II. In 1940, Hamilton suggested that Labour and National should form a wartime coalition, but this was rejected by Labour leader Peter Fraser. Fraser did, however, agree to establish a six-person "War Cabinet". This cabinet would control New Zealand's military endeavours, while leaving domestic concerns to the regular cabinet. The War Cabinet would consist of four Labour MPs and two National MPs. Hamilton and Coates were National's two representatives. Participation in the War Cabinet was fatally damaging to Hamilton's leadership of the National Party, however, as many National MPs argued that he could not be party leader while serving on a Labour-led council. On 25 November, a vote of 13 to 8 replaced Hamilton with Sidney Holland.

Later career

Hamilton remained a part of the War Cabinet, and was eventually joined by Holland (despite the original claims that a National Party leader could not be in Cabinet). In 1942, however, National withdrew from all co-operation with the Labour Party. Hamilton, along with Gordon Coates, protested against this move, and ceased attending National caucus meetings. Both Hamilton and Coates then rejoined the war administration despite condemnation from their party colleagues.

Eventually, Hamilton managed to bring about a rapprochement with the National Party, unlike Coates who became an independent, and he contested the 1943 election as a National candidate. He did not seek re-election in the 1946 election, choosing to retire from politics.

Hamilton died in Invercargill on 29 April 1952 and is buried at Winton Cemetery.

References

See also 

 Electoral history of Adam Hamilton

Further reading

|-

|-

|-

1880 births
1952 deaths
Members of the Cabinet of New Zealand
Reform Party (New Zealand) MPs
New Zealand National Party MPs
New Zealand National Party leaders
New Zealand Presbyterians
New Zealand people of Scottish descent
People from Southland, New Zealand
Leaders of the Opposition (New Zealand)
Members of the New Zealand House of Representatives
New Zealand MPs for South Island electorates
Unsuccessful candidates in the 1922 New Zealand general election